The Dude is the debut solo studio album by American rapper Devin the Dude. It was released on June 16, 1998 via Rap-A-Lot Records. Production was handled mostly by Michael "Domo" Poye, alongside several other record producers including Joe Bythewood, N.O. Joe, Mr. Lee and Tone Capone. It features guest appearances from K.B., K-Dee, Scarface, Odd Squad, DMG and Spice 1 among others. The title of the album was a reference to the song The Dude by Quincy Jones. The album peaked at number 177 on the Billboard 200 in the United States.

Track listing

Charts

References

External links

1998 debut albums
Devin the Dude albums
Rap-A-Lot Records albums
Albums produced by N.O. Joe